A Master of Public Administration (MPA) is a specialized professional graduate degree in public administration, similar or equivalent to a Master of Business Administration but with an emphasis on the issues of public services.

Overview 
The MPA program is a higher professional degree and a post graduate degree for the public sector and it prepares individuals to serve as managers, executives and policy analysts in the executive arm of local, state/provincial, and federal/national government, and increasingly in   non-governmental organization (NGO) and nonprofit sectors; it places a focus on the systematic investigation of executive organization and management. Instruction includes the roles, development, and principles of public administration; public policy management and implementation.

Through its history, the MPA degree has become more interdisciplinary by drawing from fields such as economics, sociology, law, anthropology, political science, and regional planning in order to equip MPA graduates with skills and knowledge covering a broad range of topics and disciplines relevant to the public sector. A core curriculum of a typical MPA program usually includes courses on microeconomics, public finance, research methods, statistics, policy analysis, managerial accounting, ethics, public management, geographic information systems (GIS), and program evaluation. MPA students may focus their studies on public sector fields such as urban planning, emergency management, transportation, health care (especially public health), economic development, community development, non-profit management, environmental policy, cultural policy, international affairs, and criminal justice.

MPA graduates currently serve in some important positions within the public sector including the current Prime Minister of Singapore Lee Hsien Loong, the Nobel Peace Prize laureate and former President of Colombia Juan Manuel Santos, former UN Secretary General Ban Ki-Moon, three former presidents of Mexico (Felipe Calderón, Carlos Salinas de Gortari and Miguel de la Madrid), former Canadian Prime Minister Pierre Elliott Trudeau, former President of Bolivia Eduardo Rodríguez Veltzé, former President of Ecuador  Jamil Mahuad Witt (MPA '89), former President of Costa Rica José María Figueres Olsen, former CIA Director David Petraeus, former president of Liberia Ellen Johnson Sirleaf, Foreign Minister of Serbia Vuk Jeremić, former New York City Police Commissioner Raymond Kelly, former Secretary of Health and Human Services Kathleen Sebelius, and former Treasurer of Australia Josh Frydenberg. Other notable MPA graduates include U.S. Representative Dan Crenshaw, New York City Mayor Eric Adams, Bill O'Reilly and pilot Chesley Sullenberger.

A Master of Public Administration can be acquired at various institutions. See List of schools offering MPA degrees.

See also 
Master of Public Affairs
Master of Public Policy
Master of Nonprofit Organizations
Public policy schools
Master of Business Administration
Doctor of Public Administration
List of master's degrees

References

External links 
Network of Schools of Public Policy, Affairs, and Administration - Accrediting body for MPA and MPP programs in the U.S.
Association for Public Policy Analysis and Management
American Society for Public Administration - Professional society for public administration (PA) practitioners and educator]

Public Administration, Master
Public administration